State Route 374 (SR 374) is a state highway in Nye County, Nevada, United States. It serves as Nevada's gateway to Death Valley National Park, connecting the park to Beatty.  The highway was known as State Route 58 prior to 1976.

Route description

SR 374 begins at the boundary to the Nevada portion of Death Valley National Park in Nye County.  From there, it runs due northeast across the open desert.  The route curves eastward as it passes through the mountains southwest of Beatty.  The road becomes Main Street as it enters the town's southern limits.  The route ends at US 95, where Main Street intersects Second Street. The route terminates in the northwest regions of the Amargosa Desert, and Amargosa Valley.

History

The highway first appeared on Nevada state highway maps as State Route 58 in 1937.

In the 1976 renumbering of Nevada's state highways, the route was reassigned to SR 374.  The number change was first seen on state maps in 1978.

Major intersections

See also

References

External links

AARoads: Nevada 374

374
374
Transportation in Nye County, Nevada